Defamatory libel was originally an offence under the common law of England. It has been established in England and Wales and Northern Ireland. It was or is a form of criminal libel, a term with which it is synonymous.

England, Wales and Northern Ireland

The common law offence of defamatory libel was abolished for England and Wales and Northern Ireland on 12 January 2010.

Section 4 of the Libel Act 1843 which created an aggravated statutory offence was also repealed.

History
See the following cases:

De Libellis Famosis (1606) 5 Co Rep 125a, (1606) 77 ER 250
Summer v Hillard (1665) 1 Sid 270, (1665) 82 ER 1099
R v Penny (1687) 1 Ld Raym 153, 91 ER 999
R v Burdett (1820) 4 B & Ald 95, (1820) 106 ER 873
R v Brigstock (1833) 6 Car & P 184, (1833) 172 ER 1199
R v Carden (1879) 5 QBD 1
Vizetelly v Mudie's Select Library Ltd [1900] 2 QB 170, 16 TLR 352, CA
R v Wicks (1936) 25 Cr App R 168
Goldsmith v Pressdram Ltd [1977] QB 83
Gleaves v Deakin [1980] AC 477, [1979] 2 WLR 665, [1979] 2 All ER 497, 69 Cr App R 59, [1979] Crim LR 458, HL
Desmond v Thorne [1983] 1 WLR 163, [1982] 3 All ER 268, QBD

Jurisdiction

This originally vested in the Court of Star Chamber. When that court was abolished, it was transferred to the Court of King's Bench.

Publication in a permanent form

See section 4(1) of the Theatres Act 1968 and section 166(1) of the Broadcasting Act 1990.

Restriction on institution of proceedings

See section 8 of the Law of Libel Amendment Act 1888 (replacing section 3 of the Newspaper Libel and Registration Act 1881) and section 8 of the Theatres Act 1968.

Defences

See sections 6 and 7 of the Libel Act 1843 and sections 3 and 4 of the Law of Libel Amendment Act 1888.

Functions of judge and jury

See the Libel Act 1792.

Committal proceedings – Power of magistrates to dismiss charge

See section 4 of the Newspaper Libel and Registration Act 1881.

Power of magistrates to try newspaper libel summarily with the consent of the accused

See section 5 of the Newspaper Libel and Registration Act 1881. That section was repealed by sections 17 and 65(5) of, and Schedule 13 to, the Criminal Law Act 1977.

Sentence

See sections 4 and 5 of the Libel Act 1843.

Reform

In 1985, the Law Commission recommended that the offence of defamatory libel should be abolished and replaced with a new statutory offence of "criminal defamation". The recommendation that a new statutory offence be created has not been implemented.

See also
Criminal libel
Defamation
Scandalum Magnatum

References

External links

Defamation